Aram Pachyan (real name Sevak Hakobi Tamamyan; born March 19, 1983) is an Armenian writer. He is considered one of the most prominent representatives of the post-Soviet generation of Armenian authors. He was born in Vanadzor in 1983 to the family of noted war surgeon Hakob Tamamyan. Pachyan studied law at Yerevan State University, graduating in 2004, after which he dedicated himself to writing. His early work was published in the literary newspaper Grakan Tert, and then in other literary journals such as Gretert, Eghitsi Luys, and Narcis. He works as a journalist at the Hraparak newspaper. He also writes for the radio, and in 2012 had his own radio show "At the Library with Aram Pachyan" on 106.5 Armenian News Radio.

His debut collection of short stories Robinson appeared in 2011. This was followed by his first novel Goodbye, Bird (2012) which was later adapted into a play I Am a Vegetarian (2017). Both Robinson and Goodbye, Bird have been translated into English, the latter by Nairi Hakhverdi, under the auspices of Glagoslav Press. Other books include Ocean (short stories) and P/F (novel).

He participated in the International Writing Program at the University of Iowa in 2018. He has won the Armenian Presidential Prize for Literature. In 2021, he won the EU Prize for Literature for his book P/F, becoming the first Armenian author to receive the honor.

References

21st-century Armenian writers
1983 births
Living people